Miss Tanya August-Hanson, formerly Tanya Humbles, is a member of the Legislative Council of the Isle of Man, having been elected in March 2018.

References

Members of the Legislative Council of the Isle of Man
Manx women in politics
Year of birth missing (living people)
Living people